Von Richthofen and Brown, alternatively titled The Red Baron, is a 1971 war film directed by Roger Corman and starring John Phillip Law and Don Stroud as  Manfred von Richthofen and Roy Brown. Although names of real people are used and embedded in basic historic facts, the story by Joyce Hooper Corrington and John William Corrington makes no claim to be historically accurate, and in fact is largely fictional.

Plot
Manfred von Richthofen is newly assigned to a German air squadron under the command of Oswald Boelcke. Across the lines, Roy Brown arrives at a British squadron under the command of Lanoe Hawker. The two pilots are very different; Richthofen is a gentleman who respects tradition and believes in a gentlemanly approach to war, while Brown is a cynical, cocky, ruthless rebel without a cause who doesn't believe in honor.

Boelcke is killed after a mid-air collision with fellow pilot Erwin Böhme and Hawker is killed by Richthofen. Richthofen assumes command of the squadron and becomes outwardly energized by the war. Outraged by an order to camouflage his squadron's aircraft, he paints them in bright conspicuous colors, claiming that gentlemen should not hide from their enemies. Later, Richthofen meets Ilse, a beautiful German singer who takes Baron Von Richthofen's mind off airplanes. He dances with Ilse and even kisses her. Brown bullies his way to leadership and has his squadron hunt in packs with a plane as bait.

Richthofen suffers a skull wound during an aerial battle, and begins showing troubling signs of memory loss and confusion. After Brown and his squadron attack Richthofen's airfield, destroying their aircraft on the ground, Richthofen, with the help of a batch of new fighter aircraft from Anthony Fokker, launches a counterattack on the British airfield. Back at their aerodrome, Richthofen berates fellow pilot Hermann Göring for strafing medical personnel.

Richthofen's passion for the war fades, becoming dismayed and depressed that his squadron is losing so many pilots. He refuses a job offer from the government deciding to help fight alongside his men, knowing it will probably lead to his death in combat. Caught between his disgust for the war, and the responsibility for his fighter wing, Richthofen sets out to fly again. Brown becomes very uncooperative, developing a rather defeatist attitude.

In a final battle many members two squadrons kill each other; Richthofen and Brown engage in a showdown aerial duel, at the end of which Richthofen is killed by Brown. The Allied pilots congratulate Brown, while the German squadron mourns Richthofen's death. Richthofen is buried with full military honors by the Allies, and Göring assumes command of the squadron.

Cast
 John Phillip Law as Manfred von Richthofen
 Don Stroud as Roy Brown
 Barry Primus as Hermann Göring
 Corin Redgrave as Lanoe Hawker
 Karen Huston as Ilse
Hurd Hatfield as Anthony Fokker
 Stephen McHattie as Werner Voss
 Brian Foley as Lothar von Richthofen
 Robert La Tourneaux as Ernst Udet
 Peter Masterson as Oswald Boelcke
 David Weston as Murphy
 Tom Adams as Owen
 Seamus Forde as Kaiser Wilhelm II
 Maureen Cusack as Richthofen's mother
 Ferdy Mayne as Richthofen's father
 Lorraine Rainer as French girl in the woods

Production

Development
 

Roger Corman had been interested in making a film about Manfred von Richthofen for a number of years. He felt that the Baron was the last true knight, an aristocratic warrior with a code of honor, and wanted to show how the Baron's way of thinking was archaic compared to the wholesale slaughter of World War I. Another thing he wanted to do was to contrast the Baron with the man who had been credited with shooting him down, Canadian RAF pilot Roy Brown, although it is now considered all but certain by historians, doctors, and ballistics experts that Richthofen was actually killed by an AA machine gunner firing from the ground.

In 1965 it was announced he had commissioned a script called The Red Baron from Robert Towne. He pitched the project to 20th Century Fox along with the St Valentine's Day Massacre; Fox decided to make the latter, as they already had The Blue Max.

Years later Corman signed a deal with United Artists who liked the idea of a film about the Red Baron but did not want the film to be too German, so Corman agreed to make it about Roy Brown and other characters from both areas of the battle front that could be added to the script.

Although the story of the two foes who meet in a fateful last flight, was essentially a historical subject, Corman's intention was to treat the subject as an allegory of the modern war machine in conflict with antiquated old world notions of chivalry.

Work on the film went ahead, with Corman able to work with a much larger budget than he enjoyed with his earlier features. Ex-RCAF pilot Lynn Garrison supplied the aircraft, crews and facilities, and personally coordinated the flying sequences; Garrison had purchased the collection of hangars, aircraft, vehicles and support equipment accumulated for filming 20th Century's top-grossing film, The Blue Max, after the production wrapped in 1965. The collection included replica Pfalz D.IIIs, Royal Aircraft Factory S.E.5s, Fokker D.VIIs, Fokker Dr.Is. A number of de Havilland DH.82A Tiger Moths and Stampe SV.4Cs had also been converted to represent other aircraft, for a total of 12 aircraft available for aerial scenes. As with "The Blue Max," flying sequences were based at Weston Airport in Ireland. Richard Bach, author of Jonathan Livingstone Seagull, was one of the film's stunt pilots, and wrote about some of his experiences at Weston during its production.

United Artists who were financing the picture turned down Bruce Dern who was Corman's original choice for Roy Brown. Don Stroud - whom Corman had selected to play Richthofen - was given the role instead and John Phillip Law was cast as the Baron. United Artists also insisted on re-dubbing the actors' voices with fake German accents in post-production.

Shooting
For the aerial sequences, Corman used an Aérospatiale Alouette II helicopter, along with a Helio Courier, for the photography, supported by a number of specialized camera mounts Garrison developed for use on individual aircraft. This allowed footage of actors, such as John Philip Law and Don Stroud "flying" the aircraft. Garrison trained Law and Stroud to the point where they could take off, land a Stampe, and fly basic sequences themselves from the rear seat, filmed with a rear-facing camera. Stunt pilots such as Bach were used for the more complicated sequences.

Corman used a filming schedule that included so-called "Blue Days, Grey Days and Don’t Give a Damn Days" so that the aircraft were used no matter what the weather presented.

On 15 September 1970, Charles Boddington, a veteran of both The Blue Max and Darling Lili, was killed when his S.E.5 spun in during a low-level manoeuvre over the airfield. The next day, during the last scheduled flight on the shooting schedule, Garrison and Stroud were involved in a low-level sequence across Lake Weston in a Stampe, when a jackdaw struck Garrison in the face, knocking him unconscious. The aircraft then ran through five powerlines, snap rolled and plunged into the River Liffey inverted. Garrison and Stroud were rescued from the water. Stroud was uninjured, but Garrison required 60 stitches to close a head wound. Both incidents occurring in such a short period resulted in Irish authorities grounding the production. Corman lobbied for restoration of flying and a few days later, was successful.

Some of the interior shots in Von Richthofen and Brown were filmed at Powerscourt House, a noted stately home in County Wicklow Ireland. Powerscourt had been designed by Richard Cassels, a German architect, and the entrance hall had a Germanic motif, lending a visual connection to a German location. Some external shots were filmed outside the Irish parliament building, Leinster House.

A sex scene between Law and Karen Huston was edited out after it caused a preview audience to laugh.

Corman found the movie exhausting. He later said "by that time I had directed somewhere between fifty and sixty films in, I think, twelve or thirteen years... I was so tired, I remember each day as I drove out from Dublin, and I'd come to a fork in the road. One way was the airport where we were shooting and the other was to Galway Bay. Each day I came to that fork in the road I thought I would just like to drive to Galway Bay. I barely completed the film, so I said to myself, I will complete this film, but I'm going to take a year off, the traditional sabbatical rest."

Although heavily involved as a producer during the interim, he did not direct another film until Frankenstein Unbound (1990).

Reception
Von Richthofen and Brown received mixed to negative reviews from both viewers and critics, although Roger Greenspun, in his review for The New York Times saw Corman's work as "... an extraordinarily impressive movie by a filmmaker whose career has not always been marked by success, or even noble failure." Critics also connected Corman's anti-war views with the central characters of the film, seeing the antagonists as representing the modern relentless killing machine versus old world chivalry.

As an aviation epic, reviewer Leonard Maltin noted, "Aerial work is excellent, it's the ground work which crashes."

See also
 List of American films of 1971
The Red Baron

References

Explanatory notes

Citations

Bibliography

 Bach, Richard. A Gift of Wings. New York: Dell, 1989. .
 Corman, Roger. How I Made A Hundred Movies In Hollywood And Never Lost A Dime. New York: da Capo Press, 1978. .
 Corman, Roger. Roger Corman: Interviews. Jackson, Mississippi: University Press of Mississippi, 2012. .
 Corman, Roger and Jim Jerome. How I Made a Hundred Movies in Hollywood and Never Lost a Dime. London: Muller, 1990. .
 Evans, Alun. Brassey's Guide to War Films. Dulles, Virginia: Potomac Books, 2000. .
 Hardwick, Jack and Ed Schnepf. "A Viewer's Guide to Aviation Movies". The Making of the Great Aviation Films, General Aviation Series, Volume 2, 1989.
 Hyams, Jay. War Movies. New York: W.H. Smith Publishers, Inc., 1984. .
 Maltin, Leonard. Leonard Maltin's Movie Guide 2009. New York: New American Library, 2009 (originally published as TV Movies, then Leonard Maltin’s Movie & Video Guide), First edition 1969, published annually since 1988. .

External links

 
 
 

1971 films
1971 war films
American war films
American aviation films
Biographical films about military personnel
Films directed by Roger Corman
United Artists films
World War I aviation films
World War I films based on actual events
Cultural depictions of Manfred von Richthofen
Cultural depictions of Hermann Göring
Cultural depictions of Anthony Fokker
Films produced by Gene Corman
Films scored by Hugo Friedhofer
1970s English-language films
Biographical films about aviators
Films produced by Roger Corman
1970s American films